Autoroute 30 may refer to:
 A30 autoroute, in France
 Quebec Autoroute 30, in Quebec, Canada

See also 
 A30 (disambiguation)#Roads
 List of highways numbered 30